Chautauqua County/Dunkirk Airport  is a county-owned public-use airport in Chautauqua County, New York, United States. It is located three nautical miles (6 km) east of the central business district of Dunkirk, New York.

Airport
It has two asphalt paved runways: 6/24 is 6,000 by 100 feet (1,524 x 30 m) and 15/33 is 4,000 by 100 feet (1,219 x 30 m).

For the 12-month period ending July 19, 2006, the airport had 37,548 aircraft operations, an average of 102 per day: 94% general aviation and 5% air taxi and 1% military. At that time there were 41 aircraft based at this airport: 78% single-engine, 17% multi-engine, 2% jet and 2% helicopter.

Accidents And Incidents

On July 16, 2015 a Cessna 162 with only 1 pilot on board crashed shortly after takeoff from Dunkirk.  The pilot reported that the right door opened inflight and he was unable to secure it.  While attempting to secure the door, he lost control of the aircraft and crashed approximately one mile northeast of runway 6.
On May 17, 2007, a Beechcraft Baron flying from Oshawa Executive Airport to New Castle Airport experienced an in-flight engine failure and attempted to divert to Dunkirk.  The pilot was cleared for the VOR approach to Runway 24; however he missed the approach and the aircraft was observed in a flat spin, impacting the ground about 1/2 mile south-southwest of the approach end of the runway.  The pilot and two passengers were fatally injured.
On December 14, 2005, a Piper PA-46 and a Piper Aerostar collided at the intersection of runway 6/24 and runway 15/33.  Both aircraft were landing at the time of the collision.  The NTSB placed the blame on the pilot of the PA-46 who was using the incorrect common traffic advisory frequency and landed on runway 6, while the Aerostar and an uninvolved Cessna were using runway 15 that was favored by the current wind conditions.  The wingtips of the aircraft contacted.  Both aircraft were substantially damaged but there were no injuries.

References

External links 
 Chautauqua County/Dunkirk Airport (DKK) at New York State DOT airport directory
 Airport page at Chautauqua County website
 Dunkirk Aviation Sales & Service, the fixed-base operator (FBO)
 Aerial photo as of 21 April 1994 from USGS The National Map
 

Airports in New York (state)
Transportation buildings and structures in Chautauqua County, New York